Guru Mayadhar Raut (born 6 July 1930) is an Indian classical Odissi dancer, choreographer and Guru.

Early life and background
Raut was born in the village Kantapenhara a Ahir family in Cuttack district, subsequently he received his dance training under the Guru-shishya tradition of Odissi by Rukmini Devi Arundale at Kalakshetra.

He is married to Mamta Khuntia, and they have one daughter and two sons; daughter Madhumita Raut is also a noted Odissi dancer.

Career

Mayadhar Raut has played a major role in giving Odissi its classical 'shastra' based status. He introduced Mudra Vinyoga in 1955. His notable compositions include ‘Pashyati Dishi Dishi’ and ‘Priya Charu Shile’, composed in 1961.

Mayadhar Raut is considered a master of Natyashastra and Abhinaya Darpana, and has enriched the Abhinaya vocabulary of Odissi. He taught in Kala Vikas Kendra founded by Babulal Josi in Orissa, and trained dancers Surendranath Jena, Hare Krishna Behera and Ramani Ranjan Jena. Raut taught at Shriram Bharatiya Kala Kendra from 1970 until 1995.

As one of the founder member of Jayantika, an association formed in the 1950s, Guruji Mayadhar Raut has played a major role in giving Odissi its classical status. He is the first Odissi Guru to introduce MUDRA VINYOGA in the study of Odissi in 1955 and SANCHARIBHAVA in the Odissi dance items and also the first to present on stage enchanting Gitagovinda ASHTAPADIS, portraying SHRINGARA RASA. His notable compositions include ‘Pashyati Dishi Dishi’. ‘Priya Charu Shile’, composed in 1961. Earlier, only the Oriya songs or the ASHTAPADI ‘Lalit Lavanga Lata’ and ‘Dashavatar’ were taught and performed.

Guru Mayadhar Raut has been honoured with - Padma Shri by the President of India, Sangeet Natak Akademi Award, Sahitya Kala Parishad Award, Utkal Pratibha Puraskar, Odissi Sangeet Natak Academy Award, Rajeev Gandhi Samman, Kavi Samrat Upendra Bhanja Award and Tagore Akademi Ratna - one-time honour of Tagore Samman as a part of the ongoing commemoration of the 150th Birth Anniversary of Gurudev Rabindranath Tagore by the Sangeet Natak Akademy, National Academy of Music, Dance and Drama.

In 2010, his 80th birthday was marked by a five-day international festival of music and dance titled "Yaatra"  in Delhi. On this occasion, a book titled, Odissi Yaatra - Journey of Guru Mayadhar Raut, written by Aadya Kaktikar and edited by Madhumita Raut, was also released.

A short documentary on the life and works of Guru Mayadhar Raut is available.

In August 2015, his 85th birthday was celebrated with a series of functions in Delhi and Jaipur by his disciple and daughter Madhumita Raut

Awards 

Mayadhar Raut has received the following awards:

 Padma Shri Award (2010)
 Sangeet Natak Akademi Tagore Ratna (2011)
 Sangeet Natak Akademi Award (1985)
 Sahitya Kala Parishad Award (1984)
 Utkal Pratibha Puraskar (1984)
 Odissi Sangeet Natak Academy (1977)
 Rajeev Gandhi Samman (2003)
 Kavi Samrat Upendra Bhanja Samman (2005)
 Biju Patnaik Samman (1993)

References

 
 Odissi Yaatra : The Journey of Guru Mayadhar Raut, by Aadya Kaktikar (ed. Madhumita Raut) Publisher: B.R. Rhythms, Delhi,2010.  .
  Madhumita Raut
  Reviving Odissi with a focus on the classical The Hindu 28 December 2010
  Delectable depiction of Navararas by N K MUDGAL
  4th Guru Shishya Parampara Dance Festival Delhi
  Celebrating Guru Mayadhar Raut's 80th birthday 23–25 July 2010 New Delhi
 
  Guru Mayadhar Raut - Ashish Mohan Khokar, Bangalore, India. The Mohan Khokar Dance Collection 30 July 2010
  Arts & Entertainment Outlook Magazine April09,2001
 Odissi: What, Why and How : Evolution, Revival & Technique by Madhumita Raut,Published B.R.Rhythms,Delhi,2007. .

External links

  Jayantika
  Guru Mayadhar Raut, by Ashish Mohan Khokar, Narthaki.com, 30 July 2010

Performers of Indian classical dance
Odissi exponents
Teachers of Indian classical dance
1930 births
Living people
Dancers from Odisha
People from Cuttack district
Indian classical choreographers
Recipients of the Padma Shri in arts
Recipients of the Sangeet Natak Akademi Award
Indian choreographers
20th-century Indian educators
20th-century Indian dancers
Educators from Odisha